Jacqueline Jane White (born November 26, 1924) White is an American former actress, who had a brief career as a in Hollywood leading lady in motion pictures during the 1940s and early-1950s working as a contract player at both studios MGM and RKO, and perhaps best remembered for her roles in films Crossfire (1947) and The Narrow Margin (1952). She is one of the last surviving actresses from the Golden Age of Hollywood.

Early years
White was born on November 26 1924, to Mr. and Mrs. Floyd Garrison White. Her cousin, Frank Knox, was a Secretary of the Navy. She was from Beverly Hills, California. She attended Beverly Hills High School and the University of California, Los Angeles.

White and actress Lynn Merrick were childhood friends until White moved. They were reunited when both were in the cast of Three Hearts for Julia (1943).

Career
White's film debut resulted from her work in a drama class at UCLA. A casting director saw her in a production of Ah, Wilderness! and arranged for a screen test for her. That led to her first film appearance, in Song of Russia (1944).

White usually played either featured actresses in B-movies or supporting parts in A-movies. One of her biggest movies was Mystery in Mexico. White was under contract to both Metro-Goldwyn-Mayer, where she was cast mostly in uncredited small roles, then RKO appearing in two classics, Crossfire (1947) and The Narrow Margin (1952).

White's first lead was in Air Raid Wardens (1943) with Laurel and Hardy. Her first western film came when she left MGM for RKO and starred in Return of the Bad Men (1948).

White married in 1948, then moved with her husband to Wyoming in 1950. When she returned to Los Angeles for the birth of her first child, she was spotted in the RKO commissary visiting friends by director Richard Fleischer and producer Stanley Rubin, who offered her a featured role in The Narrow Margin (1952), a B-picture film noir.  It was her final picture.

Personal life
On November 12, 1948, White married Neal Bruce Anderson in Westwood Hills. She retired from film in 1952 and relocated to Wyoming with her husband, who started an oil business.

White has four sons and one daughter. Her husband died in 2000. She currently resides in Houston, Texas, with family.

White occasionally appears at film conventions. In 2013, she made an appearance at the annual TCM Classic Film Festival.

Filmography

See also

 List of film noir titles

References

External links

 
 Western Clippings - Jacqueline White interview
 Jacqueline White in a clip from the film Mystery in Mexico, from YouTube

1924 births
Living people
American film actresses
Actresses from Beverly Hills, California
Actresses from Los Angeles
Metro-Goldwyn-Mayer contract players
RKO Pictures contract players
University of California, Los Angeles alumni
Western (genre) film actresses
21st-century American women